|}

The Silviniaco Conti Chase is a Grade 2 National Hunt steeplechase in Great Britain which is open to horses aged five years or older. It is run at Kempton Park over a distance of about 2 miles and 4½ furlongs (2 miles, 4 furlongs and 110 yards, or 4,124 metres), and during its running there are sixteen fences to be jumped. The race is scheduled to take place each year in January.

The event is named after the racehorse Silviniaco Conti, a dual winner of Kempton Park's most prestigious race, the King George VI Chase. Prior to the 2019–20 season it was run as a Listed race under a sponsored title; the race was renamed and raised to Grade 2 status by the British Horseracing Authority from the 2020 running.

Winners since 2014

See also
 Horse racing in Great Britain
 List of British National Hunt races

References 

Racing Post:

National Hunt races in Great Britain
Kempton Park Racecourse
National Hunt chases